Beyond Dawn is a Norwegian avant-garde metal band turned electropop composed of Espen Ingierd, Petter Haavik, Tore Gjedrem, and Einar Sjursø. They are described on their official website as "Norway's Best & Least Selling Act". After two demo tapes in 1990 and 1991, the band were picked up by French label Adipocere Records, which made possible the band's first two commercial releases, 1993's Up Through the Linear Shades 7" and 1994's Longing for Scarlet Days EP. In 1995, Beyond Dawn released their critically acclaimed full-length debut Pity Love on Candlelight Records. Soon after, the band began work on an album intended to be a departure from the doom metal music they were becoming known for, but their record label was less than pleased with the band's drastic change in sound and they were soon in search of a new label. They eventually signed with Misanthropy Records and released Revelry in 1998 to more critical praise. Beyond Dawn eventually resumed work on the would-be 1996 album and, after adding additional material and overdubs, released In Reverie in 1999 on Eibon Records, which would also be reissued in 2005 with two bonus tracks. During the latter half of 1999, they released Electric Sulking Machine on the Peaceville label, which soon became a favorite amongst fans and remains sought after due to its limited pressing.

During the span of their career, Beyond Dawn's sound has gradually evolved from the doom metal present on their early releases to the minimalistic electropop present on the band's 2003 release, Frysh. In addition to this, the trombone, which was a core part of Beyond Dawn's sound on nearly all of their 1990s works, is not featured on their later output. Due to the limited commercial success of Frysh, the band went on hiatus in 2003 to focus on other projects. Some time later, several tracks from Frysh were remixed by various electronic and EBM artists and released in the form of the double LP We're Down with Species of Any Kind in 2005. Currently, the band remains on an indefinite hiatus.

Discography
 Tales from an Extinguished World (demo) (1990)
 Heaven's Dark Reflection (demo) (1991)
 Up Through the Linear Shades (7") (1993)
 Longing for Scarlet Days (1994)
 Pity Love (1995)
 Revelry (1998)
 In Reverie (1999)
 Electric Sulking Machine (1999)
 Far from Showbiz (single) (2003)
 Frysh (2003)
 We're Down with Species of Any Kind (2x LP) (2005)
 Bygones (2009)

Current line-up
Tore Gjedrem – bass
Petter Haavik – guitar
Espen Ingierd – guitar and vocals
Einar Sjursø (Virus, Ved Buens Ende) – drums

External links
 Official website
 Interview with Espen Ingierd about BEYOND DAWN, XI/2009

Norwegian avant-garde metal musical groups
Norwegian synthpop groups
Norwegian electronic music groups
Norwegian pop music groups
Musical groups established in 1990
1990 establishments in Norway
Musical groups disestablished in 2003
2003 disestablishments in Norway
Musical quartets
Candlelight Records artists
Peaceville Records artists
Musical groups from Norway with local place of origin missing